

Events calendar

+4